Krakonoš a lyžníci (Krakonoš and the skiers) is a Czech comedy film. It was released in 1981.

Set in the Czech mountains on the Polish border, in a predominantly poor society, this film combines a fairy tale with reality: the protagonists (two young brothers from a poor family) meet a man that to them is the mythological "Man of the Mountains" also known as the Krakonoš, who rewards those who come to the mountains with good intentions and punishes those who come with bad in their heart. He is said to be a very magical being, and that's what makes the children think that the man they've met is the Krakonoš, because in their eyes he can fly. Of course, he isn't actually flying: the film is set when skiing was unheard of, so a man with long wooden sticks on his feet that speeds over the snow would seem like a magical being. However, the person that they befriend is actually a smuggler, who crosses the Polish border every now and then to bring over goods that the poor people on the Czech side can actually afford. Of course, the border police are constantly attempting to catch this man, so the two boys soon find themselves wound up in rather complex situation, all portrayed with a great sense of humour.

External links
 

1980 films
1980 comedy films
Czech comedy films
1980s Czech films